Kampman is a surname. Notable people with the surname include:

 A.A. Kampman (1911–1977), Dutch scholar
 Rudolph Kampman (1914–1987), Canadian ice hockey player
 Harri Kampman (born 1954), Finnish football manager
 Aaron Kampman (born 1979), American football player

See also
 Kampmann